Kalasar may refer to:
 Kalasar, Armenia
 Kalasar, Iran